Shunta Ishikura (born 7 January 1937) is a Japanese wrestler. He competed in the men's Greco-Roman light heavyweight at the 1960 Summer Olympics.

References

External links
 

1937 births
Living people
Japanese male sport wrestlers
Olympic wrestlers of Japan
Wrestlers at the 1960 Summer Olympics
Sportspeople from Toyama Prefecture
20th-century Japanese people